In chemistry, pyran, or oxine, is a six-membered heterocyclic, non-aromatic ring, consisting of five carbon atoms and one oxygen atom and containing two double bonds. The molecular formula is C5H6O. There are two isomers of pyran that differ by the location of the double bonds.  In 2H-pyran, the saturated carbon is at position 2, whereas, in 4H-pyran, the saturated carbon is at position 4.

4H-Pyran was first isolated and characterized in 1962 via pyrolysis of 2-acetoxy-3,4-dihydro-2H-pyran. It was found too unstable, particularly in the presence of air.  4H-pyran easily disproportionates to the corresponding dihydropyran and the pyrylium ion, which is easily hydrolyzed in aqueous medium.

Although the pyrans themselves have little significance in chemistry, many of their derivatives are important biological molecules, such as the pyranoflavonoids.

The term pyran is also often applied to the saturated ring analog, which is more properly referred to as tetrahydropyran (oxane).  In this context, the monosaccharides containing a six-membered ring system are known as pyranoses.

See also
 Benzene
 Pyranose
 Furan
 Furfural
 Pyridine
 Pyrone
 Thiopyran

References